The 2022 Qatar Open (also known as 2022 Qatar ExxonMobil Open for sponsorship reasons) was the 30th edition of the Qatar Open, a men's tennis tournament played on outdoor hard courts. It was part of the ATP Tour 250 of the 2022 ATP Tour, and took place at the Khalifa International Tennis and Squash Complex in Doha, Qatar from 14 to 19 February 2022.

Champions

Singles 

  Roberto Bautista Agut def.  Nikoloz Basilashvili, 6–3, 6–4

Doubles 

  Wesley Koolhof /  Neal Skupski def.  Rohan Bopanna /  Denis Shapovalov 7–6(7–4), 6–1.

Points and prize money

Point distribution

Prize money 

*per team

Singles main-draw entrants

Seeds 

 1 Rankings are as of 7 February 2022.

Other entrants 
The following players received wildcards into the singles main draw:
  Marin Čilić
  Malek Jaziri
  Andy Murray

The following players received entry from the qualifying draw:
  Christopher Eubanks
  Thomas Fabbiano
  Jozef Kovalík
  Christopher O'Connell

The following players received entry as lucky losers:
  João Sousa
  Elias Ymer

Withdrawals
 Before the tournament
  Alex de Minaur → replaced by  Alex Molčan
  Filip Krajinović → replaced by  Elias Ymer
  Gaël Monfils → replaced by  Emil Ruusuvuori
  Lorenzo Musetti → replaced by  João Sousa
  Jan-Lennard Struff → replaced by  Jiří Veselý

Doubles main-draw entrants

Seeds 

 1 Rankings are as of 7 February 2022.

Other entrants 
The following pairs received wildcards into the doubles main draw:
  Issa Alharrasi /  Illya Marchenko
  Malek Jaziri /  Mubarak Zaid

The following pair received entry as alternates:
  Emil Ruusuvuori /  Elias Ymer

Withdrawals 
 Before the tournament
  Kwon Soon-woo /  Lorenzo Musetti → replaced by  Emil Ruusuvuori /  Elias Ymer
  Arthur Rinderknech /  Jan-Lennard Struff → replaced by  Manuel Guinard /  Arthur Rinderknech

References

External links 
 

Qatar Open
2022
Qatar Open
Qatar Open